Whip snake may refer to:

Genera 
 Ahaetulla, endemic to southern Asia, from India to Vietnam
 Demansia, endemic to Australia, Papua New Guinea, and nearby islands
 Hemorrhois, endemic to the western Mediterranean, west, central, and southern Asia
 Hierophis, endemic to southern Europe
 Masticophis, endemic to the Americas
 Psammophis, endemic to Africa and Asia

Species 
 Caspian whipsnake (Dolichophis caspius), found in the Balkans and Eastern Europe
 Red whip snake (Platyceps collaris), found in Bulgaria and the Levant
 Suta dwyeri, found in Australia from New South Wales to South Queensland
 White-lipped snake (Drysdalia coronoides), found in Tasmania and southeastern Australia

Animal common name disambiguation pages